Xylariopsis fulvonotata is a species of beetle in the family Cerambycidae. It was described by Pic in 1928. It is known from Vietnam.

References

Apomecynini
Beetles described in 1928